Almog Buzaglo (born December 8, 1992) is an Israeli professional footballer who plays for Sektzia Ness Ziona.

Personal life
Almog's father is Jacob Buzaglo a former player who played in the 70's and 80's in Hapoel Tel Aviv, Beitar Jerusalem and Hapoel Jerusalem. His older brothers are Maor Buzaglo of Hapoel Be'er Sheva and Asi Buzaglo who also plays in Maccabi Amishav Petah Tikva. and Ohad Buzaglo Manager at Hapoel Jerusalem.

Career
On 5 December 2009, Buzaglo made his Israeli Premier League debut in Hapoel Petah Tikva's 2–0 loss to Hapoel Be'er Sheva in a match where his older brother Asi also played. He came on the 70th minute as a substitute for Armon Ben-Naim.

Honours

Club
Bnei Yehuda
Israel State Cup (1): 2016–17

References

1992 births
Living people
Israeli Jews
Israeli footballers
Hapoel Petah Tikva F.C. players
Maccabi Ironi Amishav Petah Tikva F.C. players
Maccabi Jaffa F.C. players
Hapoel Ramat Gan F.C. players
Bnei Yehuda Tel Aviv F.C. players
Hapoel Haifa F.C. players
Sektzia Ness Ziona F.C. players
Footballers from Karmiel
Israeli people of Moroccan-Jewish descent
Israeli Premier League players
Liga Leumit players
Association football midfielders